Spanish Love Songs is an American rock band from Los Angeles, California that was founded in 2013. The band consists of lead vocalist and guitarist Dylan Slocum, guitarist Kyle McAulay, drummer Ruben Duarte, bassist Trevor Dietrich, and keyboardist Meredith Van Woert. Since their formation, Spanish Love Songs has released three studio albums: Giant Sings the Blues (2015), Schmaltz (2018), and Brave Faces Everyone (2020).

History

2013-2019: Formation and early releases
Spanish Love Songs was founded in 2013 in Los Angeles, California. They started as a trio with Dylan Slocum (vocals, guitar), Gabe Mayeshiro (bass), and Ruben Duarte (drums). Guitarist Kyle McAulay joined shortly after, making them a four-piece. The band played their first show in August 2013. They began recording their debut EP which later became their debut studio album. The band released their debut studio album in March 2015 titled Giant Sings the Blues. The album was released through their own label. In 2016, the band signed with Wiretap Records and rereleased their debut album with bonus tracks. On October 24, 2016, the band released Little Giants, a collection of b-sides from Giant Sings the Blues. In 2017, keyboardist Meredith Van Woert joined the band, making them a five-piece. In 2018, the band released their second studio album, Schmaltz. On November 30, 2018, the band released a cover of "Funeral" by Phoebe Bridgers.

2020-2022: Brave Faces Everyone and Brave Faces Etc

In 2020, Spanish Love Songs released their third studio album titled Brave Faces Everyone. The album debuted at No. 21 on Vinyl Albums chart and No. 61 on the Top Album Sales chart with 2000 copies sold. Along with the album, the band announced a tour in the U.K. with the Menzingers and a U.S. tour with the Wonder Years. The tour started on January 25, 2020. On July 14, 2021, the band released "Phantom Limb", a track from the Brave Faces Everyone sessions, along with a cover of "Blacking Out the Friction" by Death Cab for Cutie. On October 28, 2021, the band released a cover of "I Miss You" by Blink-182. On February 1, 2022, the band announced Brave Faces, Etc., a complete reimagining of Brave Faces Everyone, along with the release of the lead singles, new versions of "Generation Loss" and "Optimism (As a Radical Life Choice)". On February 24, a new version of "Dolores" was released. On March 16, a new version of "Losers 2". The band released the final teaser track, "Kick", on April 6. On April 15, the band released Brave Faces, Etc. On August 4th, 2022, the band released a cover of "We’ve Had Enough" by Alkaline Trio.

2023-Present: Upcoming fourth studio album
On August 31, 2022, the band confirmed it had wrapped its fourth studio album recording via Instagram.

Musical style
Spanish Love Songs' musical style has been described as punk rock, emo, pop punk, indie rock, pop rock, alternative rock, garage punk, and indie punk. The band calls themselves "grouchrock". Rich Wilson of AllMusic considers the band to be "[a continuation of] the emotional punk tradition started by bands such as Jawbreaker and Hot Water Music."

Band members

Current members
 Dylan Slocum – lead vocals, guitar (2013–present)
 Kyle McAulay – guitar (2013–present)
 Ruben Duarte – drums (2013–present)
 Trevor Dietrich – bass (2017–present)
 Meredith Van Woert – keyboards (2017–present)

Former members
 Gabe Mayeshiro – bass (2013–2016)

Discography
Studio albums

Reimagined albums

References

Musical groups from Los Angeles
Punk rock groups from California
Emo musical groups from California
Pop punk groups from California
American pop rock music groups
Indie rock musical groups from California
A-F Records artists
Pure Noise Records artists
Musical groups established in 2013
2013 establishments in California